The Berkshire Athenaeum is a public library (1872) based on a previously private athenaeum, and now at 1 Wendell Avenue, Pittsfield, Massachusetts in the Berkshires, United States. Like many New England libraries, the Berkshire Athenaeum started as a private organization.

A private Public Library Association was founded in 1850. The name was later changed to the Berkshire Athenæum. Later still, Thomas F. Plunkett, Calvin Martin and Thomas Allen, were "instrumental in forming it into a free library." "In 1874, by means of a bequest from Phinehas Allen, and the gift of [the 1876] building from Thomas Allen, the Berkshire Athenaeum was placed upon a firm foundation."

In 1903, the Berkshire Athenaeum assumed the responsibility for the newly created Berkshire Museum, and was both a public library and museum until the museum spun off in 1932. The Berkshire Athenaeum is now Pittsfield's public library and contains a collection of more than 150,000 items. The library's special collections on local history, genealogy, local author Herman Melville, and other Berkshire authors are some of the best in the northeast.

Design
Designed by New York architect William Appleton Potter, the original Berkshire Athenaeum building was erected in 1874-1876 as a gift from railway magnate and native son Thomas Allen. It is in the High Victorian Gothic style, constructed of dark blue limestone from Great Barrington, red freestone from Longmeadow and red granite from Missouri. The 1876 building became the Berkshire County Registry of Deeds in 1975 when the Berkshire Athenaeum moved to the current library building two doors away.

Special collections

Local History Collection
The collection is geared to those with historical interest in the City of Pittsfield and its residents. With close to 4,700 square feet, the department is located at the east end of the main floor of the Athenaeum, with additional closed stack space located in the storage room on the lower floor.

The Local History Collection provides historical and genealogical information primarily about the Berkshires and greater Berkshire area, but it also includes New England, eastern New York State, and Southern Canada to showcase the origin of Berkshire families.

Local History Department
It is a storage room located on the basement level and has 1,800 linear feet of shelf space housing an overflow collection of historical materials less in demand by the public, or replacement copies of highly used materials. This area is not accessible to the public.
Genealogy Resources 
The collection totals 71,000 reels of film, books, and finding aids, which were formerly held by the National Archives and Records Administration (NARA) Pittsfield facility. All researchers must fill a request form to gain on-site access.

Berkshire Authors Room
The Berkshire Authors Room houses a collection of books and other materials by and about authors with a connection to the Berkshires.

Herman Melville Memorial Room
The Herman Melville Memorial Room collection includes first editions of writer Herman Melville's works, manuscripts, family letters, and annotated volumes from his personal library.  Paintings. prints, and photographs of him are also available. In addition, the collection showcases biographies and critical studies works produced by Melville scholars.

The Herman Melville Memorial Room was mainly planned and funded by Dr. Henry Murray of Harvard University. Melville’s relatives have donated other primary sources, such as his books and memorabilia.

References
 Joseph E. A. Smith, The History of Pittsfield, Massachusetts; Clark W. Bryan & Co., publishers; Springfield, Massachusetts 1876

External links 
 Berkshire Athenaeum — Pittsfield's Public Library

Public libraries in Massachusetts
Buildings and structures in Pittsfield, Massachusetts
Libraries in Berkshire County, Massachusetts
William Appleton Potter buildings
1872 establishments in Massachusetts
Library buildings completed in 1876